Thun District in the Canton of Bern, Switzerland was created on 1 January 2010. It is part of the Oberland administrative region.

Mergers
 On 1 January 2014 the former municipalities of Niederstocken, Oberstocken and Höfen merged into the municipality of Stocken-Höfen and the former municipality of Kienersrüti merged into the municipality of Uttigen.
 On 1 January 2020 the former municipality of Schwendibach merged into the municipality of Steffisburg.

References

Districts of the canton of Bern